Bodeyevka is a rural locality (a selo) and the administrative center of Bodeyevskoye Rural Settlement, Liskinsky District, Voronezh Oblast, Russia. The population was 603 as of 2010. There are 5 streets.

Geography 
Bodeyevka is located 32 km northwest of Liski (the district's administrative centre) by road. Novozadonsky is the nearest rural locality.

References 

Rural localities in Liskinsky District